The marbled poison frog or marbled poison-arrow frog (Epipedobates boulengeri) is a species of frog in the family Dendrobatidae found in western Colombia (Cauca, Nariño, Valle del Cauca Departments, including Gorgona Island) and northwestern Ecuador, at elevations of  asl. It likely represents a species complex of at least two species.

Description
Males measure  and females  in snout–vent length. Colouration is variable; dorsum is dark reddish to uniform dark brown, sides are black. There is a pale yellowish or creamy white lateral line and cream-coloured dorsolateral line. Iris is dark coppery black.

Diet
Diet is varied and includes mites, ants, coleopterans, dipterans, homopterans, and colembolas.

Habitat and conservation
Its natural habitats are dense moist tropical rainforests as well as altered habitats like gardens and railway tunnels. It is a common species. It is threatened by habitat loss; while a somewhat adaptable species, it disappears if the habitat becomes too open and dry.

References

Epipedobates
Amphibians of Colombia
Amphibians of Ecuador
Amphibians described in 1909
Taxa named by Thomas Barbour
Taxonomy articles created by Polbot